Chambeyronia macrocarpa is a species of palm tree commonly known as the red leaf palm. It is sometimes called the flamethrower palm. The species is endemic to New Caledonia.

References

External links
 New Caledonia Palm Gallery

macrocarpa
Endemic flora of New Caledonia
Trees of New Caledonia
Plants described in 1873
Taxa named by Adolphe-Théodore Brongniart
Taxa named by Eugène Vieillard
Taxa named by Odoardo Beccari